NGC 4639 is a barred spiral galaxy located in the equatorial constellation of Virgo. It was discovered by German-born astronomer William Herschel on April 12, 1784. John L. E. Dreyer described it as "pretty bright, small, extended, mottled but not resolved, 12th magnitude star 1 arcmin to southeast". This is a relatively nearby galaxy, lying approximately 72 million light-years away from the Milky Way. It is a companion to NGC 4654, and the two appear to have interacted roughly 500 million years ago. NGC 4639 is a member of the Virgo Cluster.

The morphological classification of this galaxy is SAB(rs)bc, indicating a spiral galaxy with a weak bar (SAB), an incomplete ring around the bar (rs), and moderate to loosely-wound spiral arms (bc). NGC 4639 has a mildly active galactic nucleus of the Seyfert type 1; one of the weakest known. The compact central source has been detected by its X-ray emission, and is variable on timescales of months to years.

The classical Type Ia Supernova SN 1990N was discovered in this galaxy on June 22, 1990, two weeks before reaching peak brightness. The brightness and proximity of this supernova event has allowed it to be used as a standard candle.

References

External links 
 

Barred spiral galaxies
Virgo Cluster
Virgo (constellation)
4639
07884
42741